Dąb is a district of Katowice. It has an area of 1.86 km2 and in 2007 had 7,694 inhabitants.

References

Districts of Katowice